Events from the year 1901 in Russia.

Incumbents

 Monarch – Tsar Nicholas II

Events

 26 May _ Russian cruiser Boyarin launched without presence of the Imperial Russian Army.
 7 September _ End of the Boxer Rebellion.

Births
 17 January _ Aron Gurwitsch, a Litvak American phenomenologist. (died 1973)
 4 February _ Alexander Werth, writer, journalist, and war correspondent. (died 1969)
 15 May _ Boris Berman (chekist), chekist and leading member of the NKVD.
 18 June _ Grand Duchess Anastasia Nikolaevna of Russia, youngest daughter of Tsar Nicholas II (died 1918)
 20 June _ Princess Nina Georgievna of Russia, elder daughter of Grand Duke George Mikhailovich and Grand Duchess Maria Georgievna of Russia who spent her life in exile (died 1974)
 15 August  _ Prince Dmitri Alexandrovich of Russia, nephew of Tsar Nicholas II. (died 1980)
 September 14 _ Andrey Vlasov,  Russian general of Red Army who later led Russian Liberation Army against U.S.S.R. (died 1946)
 10 December 
 Vladimir Boyarsky,  a collaborator with Nazi Germany during World War II, serving in Andrey Vlasov's Russian Liberation Army. (died 1945)
 Karandash, famous Soviet clown and was the teacher of the famous Russian clowns Oleg Popov and Yuri Nikulin.
 22 December _ Andre Kostelanetz, Russian-born American popular orchestral music conductor and arranger. (died 1980)

Deaths

References

1901 in Russia
Years of the 20th century in the Russian Empire